Combine is a term for industrial business groups, conglomerates or trusts in the former socialist countries. Examples include VEB Kombinat Robotron, an electronics manufacturer, and IFA, a manufacturer of  vehicles, both in East Germany, and the Erdenet copper combine in Mongolia.

See also
Production association

References

External links
 Комбiнат at a dictionary of the Ukrainian language 
 Production Association (combine). The following article is from The Great Soviet Encyclopedia (1979). It might be outdated or ideologically biased.
 Combine (industry). The following article is from The Great Soviet Encyclopedia (1979). It might be outdated or ideologically biased.

Conglomerate companies
Manufacturing companies of Russia
Manufacturing companies of the Soviet Union